Chinese folklore encompasses the folklore of China, and includes songs, poetry, dances, puppetry, and tales. It often tells stories of human nature, historical or legendary events, love, and the supernatural. The stories often explain natural phenomena and distinctive landmarks. Along with Chinese mythology, it forms an important element in Chinese folk religion.

History

Folktales

The main influences on Chinese folk tales have been Taoism, Confucianism and Buddhism. Some folktales may have arrived from Germany when Grimm brothers had contributed some materials for the folktales regard to the country life of the German dwellers since the 1840s; others have no known western counterparts, but are widespread throughout East Asia. Chinese folktales include a vast variety of forms such as myths, legends, fables, etc. A number of collections of such tales, such as Pu Songling's Strange Stories from a Chinese Studio, now remain popular.

Each Chinese folktale includes the representation of various objects and animals and uses symbolic messages through its characters and usually strives to convey a message that instills the reader with some sort of virtuous insight. These messages are vital to Chinese culture and through these folktales, they will be passed down to future generations to also learn from.

Animals 
The Great Race is a folk story that describes the creation of the Chinese zodiac calendar that includes twelves animals each representing a specific year in a twelve-year cycle.

Chinese folklore contains many symbolic folk meanings for the objects and animals within the folktales. One example of this is the symbolic meaning behind frogs and toads. Toads are named Ch'an Chu in Chinese, a folklore about Ch'an Chu illustrates the toad imports the implication of eternal life and perpetual. Chinese folklore unfolds the story of a Ch'an Chu (toad) is saved by Liu Hai, who is a courtier in ancient Chinese period. For recompense the gratitude to Liu Hai, Ch' an Chu divulge the secret of eternal life and being immortal to Liu Hai. And this is the origin of Ch' an Chu as a symbol of eternal in traditional Chinese folklore culture.

In the "Chinese myth of the Moon Goddess, Chang'e", frogs and toads are a symbol of wealth and prosperity as well as symbolize fertility, regeneration, yin, and immortality. It is said that there were ten suns exposing the earth in the ancient times. Hou Yi  who was an archer as well as the husband of Chang'e, he shot down nine suns from the sky with his bow and arrow. For expressing gratitude god rewarded him with pill which is an immortal elixir. In some versions of this tale, Chang'e took the pill for in avarice and she transformed into a three-legged Ch'an Chu and eventually flew to the moon. Hou Yi loved his wife so much that God allowed him to reunite annually with Chang'e at moment of the full moon on the 15th of August in Chinese lunar calendar, which is the celebration of Mid-Autumn Festival. From then on, the moon and Chang'e relate to the toad comprise the significance eternal and reunion.

Study
Formal academic study of Chinese folklore began to gain popularity in the 1910s with the New Culture Movement, which advocated Vernacular Chinese as the language of education and literature. Because most folklore was created in the spoken language, this movement brought scholars' attention to the influences of folklore on classical literature. Hu Shi of Peking University, a strong advocate of Vernacular Chinese, concluded that when Chinese writers drew their inspiration from traditional tales and songs, Chinese literature experienced a renaissance. When writers neglected these sources, they lost touch with the people of the nation. An emphasis on the study of folklore, Hu concluded, could usher in a literary renaissance. A rising sense of national identity also spurred the new interest in traditional folklore.  The first issue of the Folk-Song Weekly, a publication issued by the Folk-Song Research Society, stated that "Based on the folk songs, on the real feeling of the nation, a kind of new national poetry may be produced."

The Folksong Studies Movement became a key contributor to establishing Chinese folklore as a modern academic discipline. This movement was founded by Hu Shi's students and colleagues at Peking University, such as Gu Jiegang. They were successful in creating a field of study that focused on literature pertaining to Chinese folklore and attempted to bring to light the early traditions and culture of Chinese folklore in order to reestablish China's national spirit.; The May Fourth Movement in 1919 sparked patriotic students and scholars to collect and record historical folklore in both rural and urban areas. Folklore collections in the May Fourth Movement had a broad territorial sweep, including not only the ethnic Han, who form the majority, but also the minority areas. Folksong collection was carried by Peking University one year before the May Fourth Movement, started in 1918. 

Some folklore enthusiasts also hoped to improve the condition of the Chinese people and believed it necessary to understand their ideas, beliefs, and customs. Communist activists and scholars collected songs and local lore, often, reinventing and reinterpreting them to emphasize such themes as the virtue of the working commoner and the evil of aristocracy, while they left out stories that expressed praise for the emperor or traditional Confucian values from their collections. Widely circulated stories of today may have been treated in this way. Some claimed that folksongs played a significant part in the integration of folklore culture in the early twentieth century of China, as well as a functional tool to convey the spirit of socialism and communism after the Liberation period. After China emerged from the Maoist period in the late 1970s, the state adopted a more accepting position toward academic research on China's cultural traditions and folklore. Forbidden traditions and practices in early Chinese history became more relevant and accepted.

Poetry and Songs
The Classic of Poetry, the earliest known Chinese collection of poetry, contains 160 folk songs in addition to courtly songs and hymns. One tradition holds that Confucius himself collected these songs, while another says that an emperor compiled them as a means to gauge the mood of the people and the effectiveness of his rule.

It is believed that Confucius did encourage his followers to study the songs contained in the Classic of Poetry, helping to secure the Classic of Poetry'''s place among the Five Classics. After Confucian ideas became further entrenched in Chinese culture (after about 100 BCE), Confucius's endorsement led many scholars to study the lyrics of the Classic of Poetry and interpret them as political allegories and commentaries.

Folksongs are divided into three major parts which are shan' ge (mountain songs), xiaodiao (little tunes), and chang'ge (long songs). Regarding shan'ge the mountain songs are having a  deviation to represent the specific regional level, concentrating on rural rather than urban region.  Xiaodiao can be considered as the mainstream folksongs among the genres, which are introduced to the general public with familiarity. Always accompanied by performs and professional stage shows presenting to the public. In terms of the chang'ge, long songs, which is a certain kind of narrative songs utilized mostly by the national minorities in some special events as a narrative form in singing.

Influence of folklore on other media

 Art 
Chinese folklore has provided inspiration for visual imagery by Chinese weavers, painters, water colorists, and florists. One of the most striking examples is a silk funerary banner (circa 168 BC) that contains a number of stories from early China.

 Film 
Modern iterations of traditional Chinese stories can be found internationally as well as in native Chinese literature. Laurence Yep's The Magic Paintbrush, Maxine Hong Kingston's The Woman Warrior, and Walt Disney Pictures' Mulan (based on Hua Mulan) all borrow from Chinese folklore traditions.

 Literature 
Chinese folklore has provided inspiration for Chinese writers and poets for centuries. Folk songs, which were originally accompanied by dance and other styles of performing arts, provided inspiration for courtly poetry. Classical fiction began in the Han dynasty and was modeled after oral traditions, while Yuan and Ming era dramatic plays were influenced by folk plays.

See also
 Chinese literature
 Chinese mythology
 Classic Chinese Novels
 Dance in China
 Music of China
 
 

 References 

Further reading
 Eberhard, Wolfram, translated by Paul Freeouf (1984). "On the Question of Transmission of Folktales in China". In: Folklore Forum 17 (1): 20-60. .
 Lou Tsu-k'uang (ed.), Asian Folklore and Social Life – 2 vols. (Orient Cultural Service, Taiwan, 1975).
 Women of China (firm), Women in Chinese Folklore.  (Chinese Publications Centre, Beijing, 1983)

 Folktale indexes
 Eberhard, Wolfram. Typen Chinesischer Volksmärchen. FF Communications 120. Helsinki: Academia Scientiarum Fennica, 1937.
 Nai-tung TING. A Type Index of Chinese Folktales in the Oral Tradition and Major Works of Non-religious Classical Literature''. FF Communications, no. 223. Helsinki, Academia Scientiarum Fennica, 1978.

External links 
  
 
 
 

 
Folklore by country